Burrinjuck was an electoral district of the Legislative Assembly in the Australian state of New South Wales from 1950 to 2015.

The 2004 redistribution of electoral districts estimated that the electoral district would have 47,688 electors on 29 April 2007.  At the 2007 election it encompassed almost all of Yass Valley Shire (including Yass, but excluding Sutton), all of the Upper Lachlan (including Crookwell and Gunning), Boorowa Council, Cowra Shire, a small part of Blayney Shire (including Mandurama and Lyndhurst), Weddin Shire (including Grenfell), a small part of Bland Shire, Young Shire, Harden Shire (including the twin towns of Harden and Murrumburrah), Cootamundra Shire, Gundagai Shire and part of Junee Shire (including Bethungra and Illabo).

At the 2015 election it was replaced by the re-established electoral district of Cootamundra and the relocated electoral district of Goulburn.

Members for Burrinjuck

Election results

References

Former electoral districts of New South Wales
Constituencies established in 1950
Constituencies disestablished in 2015
1950 establishments in Australia
2015 disestablishments in Australia